Ocriers Gargas XIII are a French Rugby league club based in Gargas, in the region of Vaucluse. The club plays in the Provence-Alpes-Cote d'Azur regional National Division 2 league, which is the 4th tier competition in France. Founded in 2007 home games are played at the Stade Municipal de Gargas.

History 

The senior side was founded in 2007 but prior to that there was a successful junior set-up in Gargas. The juniors compete in tournaments and have won many titles at all under age levels. The senior side have always competed in the bottom level National Division 2 league. 2015/16 represented their most successful season yet as they finished top of the regional Provence-Alpes-Cote d'Azur league before losing out in the play-offs.

See also 

National Division 2

External links 

 Site

French rugby league teams
Rugby clubs established in 2007
2007 establishments in France